The Guangzhou–Shitan railway or Guangshi line is a railway line for both passenger and fright services, in Guangzhou, Guangdong Province, China.

Name
The railway is named after the abbreviation of its two terminals, Guangzhou North and Shitan.

Route
It starts at Guangzhou North railway station on the Beijing–Guangzhou railway and ends at a junction with the Guangzhou–Shenzhen railway. It allows freight trains to bypass the congested line through central Guangzhou and Guangzhou East stations.

History
Construction began in December 2015. The line opened on 18 August 2020.

References

Railway lines in China
Railway lines opened in 2020